Batura II, also known as Hunza Kunji or Peak 31, is a  peak in the Batura Muztagh, which is the westernmost subrange of the Karakoram range. It was first ascended in 2008 by a South Korean duo from the University of Seoul Alpine Club consisting of Kim Chang-ho and Choi Suk-mun.

Location

Batura II lies in the Batura Muztagh, which is a part of the Karakoram range, lying west of the Hunza River. The river curves around the southwest, west, and northwest sides of the Batura Muztagh. Batura Sar lies east to the peak, and along with Batura III, Batura IV, and other lower peaks, they form part of the Batura Wall.

First Ascent 
The mountain was first ascended on August 11, 2008, by Kim Chang-ho and Choi Suk-mun.

See also
List of mountains in Pakistan

References 

Seven-thousanders of the Karakoram
Mountains of Gilgit-Baltistan